Loktak Lairembee, also known as Lady of the Lake, is a 2016 Indian Meitei language film directed and produced by Haobam Paban Kumar. It stars Ningthoujam Sanatomba and Sagolsem Thambalsang in the lead roles. The film had participated in many international film festivals across the globe and won several awards. The film won the National Film Award for Best Film on Environment / Conservation / Preservation at the 64th National Film Awards.

It is the first Manipuri film to be certified by Central Board of Film Certification (CBFC) as a digital film. Loktak Lairembee is based on Sudhir Naoroibam's short story Nongmei.

Cast
 Ningthoujam Sanatomba
 Sagolsem Thambalsang
 Oinam Rajen Singh

Synopsis
Following the accidental discovery of a gun, a depressed fisherman experiences a new confidence that soon threatens to balloon into arrogance.

Accolades
Loktak Lairembee bagged two awards at the 10th Manipur State Film Awards 2016. The film won the National Film Award for Best Film on Environment / Conservation / Preservation at the 64th National Film Awards. The citation for the National Award reads, "The film brings out the nuances of an environmental issue in a heart wrenching and touching manner".

Participation in Film Festivals
 14th Indian Film Festival of Stuttgart 2017
 8th London Indian Film Festival 2017
 In Competition - 2nd BRICS Film Festival, China 2017
 Indie Power - 41st Hong Kong International Film Festival 2017.
 Indian Film Festival of Los Angeles 2017.
 Berlinale Forum – 67th Berlin International Film Festival 2017.
 15th Pune International Film Festival 2017.
 11th Asia Pacific Screen Awards.
 Indian Cinema Now - 21st Kerala International Film Festival 2016.
 World Cinema - 3rd Dubai International Film Festival 2016.
 Indian Kaleidoscope Film Festival, New York 2016.
 Indian Panorama - 47th International Film Festival of India, Goa 2016.
 22nd Kolkata International Film Festival 2016.
 21st Agartala Film Festival 2016.
 18th Mumbai Film Festival 2016.
 Asian New Currents - 21st Busan International Film Festival 2016.
 The Himalayan Film Festival 2021.

References

2010s Meitei-language films
2016 films